Gau-Algesheim is a Verbandsgemeinde ("collective municipality") in the district Mainz-Bingen in Rhineland-Palatinate, Germany. The seat of the Verbandsgemeinde is in Gau-Algesheim.

The Verbandsgemeinde Gau-Algesheim consists of the following Ortsgemeinden ("local municipalities"):

 Appenheim 
 Bubenheim 
 Engelstadt 
 Gau-Algesheim
 Nieder-Hilbersheim 
 Ober-Hilbersheim 
 Ockenheim 
 Schwabenheim an der Selz

Verbandsgemeinde in Rhineland-Palatinate